Electrogravitics is claimed to be an unconventional type of effect or anti-gravity force created by an electric field's effect on a mass. The name was coined in the 1920s by the discoverer of the effect, Thomas Townsend Brown, who spent most of his life trying to develop it and sell it as a propulsion system. Through Brown's promotion of the idea, it was researched for a short while by aerospace companies in the 1950s. Electrogravitics is popular with conspiracy theorists, with claims that it is powering flying saucers and the B-2 Stealth Bomber.

Since apparatuses based on Brown's ideas have often yielded varying and highly controversial results when tested within controlled vacuum conditions, the effect observed has often been attributed to the ion drift or ion wind effect instead of anti-gravity.

Origins
Electrogravitics had its origins in experiments started in 1921 by Thomas Townsend Brown (who coined the name) while he was in high school. He discovered an unusual effect while experimenting with a Coolidge tube, a type of X-ray vacuum tube where, if he placed on a balance scale with the tube’s positive electrode facing up, the tube's mass seemed to decrease; when facing down, the tube's mass seemed to increase. Brown showed this effect to his college professors and even newspaper reporters and told them he was convinced that he had managed to influence gravity electronically. Brown developed this into large, high-voltage capacitors that would produce a tiny, propulsive force causing the capacitor to jump in one direction when the power was turned on. In 1929, Brown published "How I Control Gravitation"  in Science and Invention where he claimed the capacitors were producing a mysterious force that interacted with the pull of gravity. He envisioned a future where, if his device could be scaled up, "Multi-impulse gravitators, weighing hundreds of tons, may propel the ocean liners of the future" or even "fantastic 'space cars'" to Mars. Somewhere along the way, Brown devised the name Biefeld–Brown effect, named after his former teacher, professor of astronomy Paul Alfred Biefeld at Denison University in Ohio. Brown claimed Biefeld as his mentor and co-experimenter .  After World War II, Brown sought to develop the effect as a means of propulsion for aircraft and spacecraft, demonstrating a working apparatus to an audience of scientists and military officials in 1952. A Cal-Tech physicist invited to observe Brown's disk device in the early '50s noted during the demonstration that its motivation force was the well-known phenomenon of "electric wind", and not anti-gravity, saying, “I’m afraid these gentlemen played hooky from their high school physics classes…”. Research into the phenomenon was popular in the mid-1950s, at one point, the Glenn L. Martin Company placed advertisements looking for scientists who were "interested in gravity", but rapidly declined in popularity thereafter.

Since this effect could not be explained by known physics at the time, the effect has been believed to be caused by ionized particles that produces a type of ion drift or ionic wind that transfers its momentum to surrounding neutral particles, electrokinetic phenomena or more widely referred to as electrohydrodynamics (EHD).

Claims
Electrogravitics has become popular with UFO, anti-gravity, and government conspiracy theorists where it is seen as an example of something much more exotic than electrokinetics, i.e. that electrogravitics is a true anti-gravity technology that can "create a force that depends upon an object’s mass, even as gravity does". There are claims that all major, aerospace companies in the 1950s, including Martin, Convair, Lear, Sperry, Raytheon, were working on it, that the technology became highly classified in the early 1960s, that it is used to power the B-2 bomber, and that it can be used to generate free energy. Charles Berlitz devoted an entire chapter of his book on The Philadelphia Experiment (The Philadelphia Experiment: Project Invisibility) to a retelling of Brown's early work with the effect, implying the electrogravitics effect was being used by UFOs. The researcher and author Paul LaViolette has produced many self-published books on electrogravitics, making many claims over the years, including his view that the technology could have helped to avoid another Space Shuttle Columbia disaster.

Criticism
Many claims as to the validity of electrogravitics as an anti-gravity force revolve around research and videos on the internet purported to show lifter-style, capacitor devices working in a vacuum, therefore not receiving propulsion from ion drift or ion wind being generated in air. Followups on the claims (R. L. Talley in a 1990 U.S. Air Force study, NASA scientist Jonathan Campbell in a 2003 experiment,  and Martin Tajmar in a 2004 paper) have found that no thrust could be observed in a vacuum, consistent with the phenomenon of ion wind. Campbell pointed out to a Wired magazine reporter that creating a true vacuum similar to space for the test requires tens of thousands of dollars in equipment.

Byron Preiss, in his 1985 book on the current science and future of the Solar System titled The Planets, commented that electrogravitics development seemed to be "much ado about nothing, started by a bunch of engineers who didn't know enough physics".  Preiss stated that electrogravitics, like exobiology, is "a science without a single specimen for study".

See also
 United States gravity control propulsion initiative
 List of topics characterized as pseudoscience

References

Further reading 

 Thomas Valone, Electrogravitics Systems: Reports on a New Propulsion Methodology. Integrity Research Institute; 2nd ed edition (November 1995). 102 pages.  
 Thomas Valone, Electrogravitics II: Validating Reports on a New Propulsion Methodology. Integrity Research Institute; 2Rev Ed edition (July 1, 2005). 160 pages.  
 Jen-shih Chang, Handbook of Electrostatic Processes. CRC Press, 1995. 
 Nick Cook, The Hunt for Zero Point: Inside the Classified World of Antigravity Technology. Broadway; 1 edition (August 13, 2002). 304 pages  
 Paul A. LaViolette, "Secrets of Antigravity Propulsion: Tesla, UFOs, and Classified Aerospace Technology". Bear & Company, Rochester VT (2008), Paperback: 512 pages,

External links 
 Electrogravitics at American Antigravity A page of YouTube talks and demonstrations by supporters.

Anti-gravity
Fringe physics
Hypothetical technology